恒隆廣場 (literally Hang Lung Plaza) may refer to properties developed by Hang Lung Properties, all located in mainland China but none of its development named as Hang Lung Plaza in Hong Kong the headquarters located:

Plaza 66, Shang Hai (上海恒隆廣場, literally Shanghai Hang Lung Plaza)
Grand Gateway 66, Shang Hai (港匯恒隆廣場, literally Grand Gateway Hang Lung Plaza)
Palace 66, Old City area, Shenyang (皇城恒隆廣場, literally Emperor City Hang Lung Plaza)
Parc 66, Jinan (濟南恒隆廣場, literally Jinan Hang Lung Plaza)
Forum 66, City Centre, Shenyang (市府恒隆廣場, literally City Centre Hang Lung Plaza)
Center 66, Wuxi (無錫恒隆廣場, literally Wuxi Hang Lung Plaza)
Riverside 66, Tianjin (天津恒隆廣場, literally Tianjin Hang Lung Plaza)
Olympia 66, Dalian (大連恒隆廣場, literally Dalian Hang Lung Plaza)
Spring City 66, Kunming (昆明恒隆廣場, literally Kunming Hang Lung Plaza)
Heartland 66, Wuhan (武漢恒隆廣場, literally Wuhan Hang Lung Plaza)
Westlake 66, Hangzhou (杭州恒隆廣場, literally Hangzhou Hang Lung Plaza)